The Church of Saint Anthony of Padua is a Roman Catholic church in Gornji Kosinj, Croatia.

It has a polygonal sanctuary, sacristy, and bell tower along the main facade.

History

The church was built in 1692, after the expulsion of the Ottomans.

References 

Churches in Croatia
Buildings and structures in Lika-Senj County